Hok Tau Reservoir is a small S-shaped reservoir situated in the northeastern New Territories, Hong Kong. The Tan Shan River flows through the reservoir and eventually empties into the Ng Tung River. The reservoir can be accessed by Stage 9 of the Wilson Trail or by the Hok Tau Reservoir Family Walk.

It is within the borders of Pat Sin Leng Country Park and the family trail has many barbecue sites adjacent to the reservoir.

External links

Reservoirs of Hong Kong (2) New Territories East (in Chinese) 
 Hok Tau Reservoir Family Walk

Reservoirs in Hong Kong
Hok Tau